Semtěš is a municipality and village in Kutná Hora District in the Central Bohemian Region of the Czech Republic. It has about 300 inhabitants.

Notable people
Božena Zelinková (1869–1936), women's rights activist

References

Villages in Kutná Hora District